The East Timorese patrol boat Atauro (P 102) is one of the two Albatroz class patrol boats operated by the Timor Leste Defence Force. She was built in the mid-1970s for the Portuguese Navy and was commissioned on 9 December 1974 as NRP Açor (P 1163). She was donated to East Timor in January 2002 and was renamed. Atauro is based at Hera Naval Base.

References

 

Atauro
Naval ships of Portugal
1974 ships